Van Buren Township is one of fourteen townships in Madison County, Indiana, United States. As of the 2010 census, its population was 1,861 and it contained 795 housing units.

History
Van Buren Township was organized in 1837. It was named for President Martin Van Buren.

Geography

Cities, towns, villages
 Summitville

Cemeteries
The township contains these two cemeteries: Musick and Vinson.

Education
 Madison-Grant United School Corporation

Van Buren Township residents may obtain a free library card from the North Madison County Public Library System with branches in Elwood, Frankton, and Summitville.

Political districts
 Indiana's 6th congressional district
 State House District 35
 State Senate District 26

References
 
 United States Census Bureau 2008 TIGER/Line Shapefiles
 IndianaMap

External links
 Indiana Township Association
 United Township Association of Indiana
 City-Data.com page for Van Buren Township

Townships in Madison County, Indiana
Townships in Indiana